Greg Bates (born September 25, 1987) is an American country music singer formerly signed to Republic Nashville.

Early life
In 2006, Bates graduated from Ravenwood High School. Bates then graduated in 2010 with a degree in Music Business from Belmont University. He signed a recording contract in the fall of 2011. Bates quietly parted ways with Republic Nashville towards the end of 2013.

Personal life
He proposed to girlfriend Shelley Skidmore on Valentine's Day 2014. The couple was married on May 2, 2015 in Stanton, Kentucky. Stanton is Shelley's hometown. The two posted up wedding pictures on Instagram.

Musical career
In April 2012, Bates released his debut single "Did It for the Girl", which debuted at Number 57 on the Hot Country Songs chart dated for April 28, 2012. Billy Dukes gave the song four stars out of five, saying that it is "instantly memorable — if only for its clean simplicity." Bates made his Grand Ole Opry debut in April 2012. The album's second single, "Fill in the Blank," was released to country radio on February 11, 2013. Bates has received air play as a "Highway Find" on satellite radio channel The Highway (Sirius XM).

Discography

Extended plays

Singles

Music videos

References

External links

American country singer-songwriters
American male singer-songwriters
Living people
People from Nashville, Tennessee
Republic Records artists
1987 births
Singer-songwriters from Tennessee
Country musicians from Tennessee
21st-century American male singers
21st-century American singers